That's Where It Is! is an album by jazz pianist Junior Mance which was recorded in 1964 and released on the Capitol label.

Reception

The Allmusic site awarded the album 3 stars.

Track listing
 "Wabash Blues" (Fred Meinken, Dave Ringle) -	4:31
 "In the Dark" (Lil Green) - 3:02
 "The Host (W.L.Y.T.M.)" (Junior Mance) - 2:25
 "I Got It Bad (and That Ain't Good)" (Duke Ellington, Paul Francis Webster) - 4:08
 "I Want a Little Girl"  (Murray Mencher, Billy Moll) – 2:45
 "That's Where It Is!" (Bill Schluger) - 2:34
 "St. Louis Blues" (W. C. Handy) - 4:37
 "It Ain't Necessarily So" (George Gershwin, Ira Gershwin) - 2:35
 "Caribe Blues" (Mance) - 2:59
 "God Bless the Child" (Arthur Herzog, Jr., Billie Holiday) - 5:15
 "Hanky Panky" (Marvin Fisher) - 2:44

Personnel
Junior Mance - piano
George Tucker - bass
Bobby Thomas - drums

References

 

1965 albums
Junior Mance albums
Capitol Records albums
Albums produced by Dave Cavanaugh